Veloso is a Portuguese surname that means "hairy". Following is a list of notable people with the surname Veloso.
Amelyn Veloso (1974-2017), a Filipino former broadcast journalist
António Veloso (born 1957), a Portuguese footballer and coach
Caetano Veloso (born 1942), a Brazilian composer and singer
Carla Veloso, a Cars series characters Female Auto racing World Grand Prix sports fiction Cars 2 (2011)
Diogo Veloso (1558–1599), a Portuguese explorer
Francisco Veloso (born 1969), a Portuguese academic
Juliana Veloso (born 1980), a Brazilian diver
Léo Veloso (born 1987), a Brazilian footballer
Lou Veloso (born 1948), a Filipino actor
Mary Jane Veloso (born 1985), a Filipino woman who was sentenced to death for smuggling heroin into Indonesia
Miguel Veloso (born 1986), a Portuguese footballer
Moreno Veloso (born 1972), a Brazilian musician and singer, son of Caetano Veloso
Manuela M. Veloso (born 1957), an American robotics and computer science academic
Rui Veloso (born 1957), a Portuguese musician
Veloso (Brazilian footballer) (born 1983), a Brazilian footballer

Portuguese-language surnames